Jakob Baechtold, surname sometimes spelled as Bächtold (27 January 1848, in Schleitheim – 7 August 1897, in Zürich) was a Swiss literary scholar.

He studied German philology under Adolf Holtzmann at the University of Heidelberg, then continued his education at the University of Munich and in 1870 received his doctorate from the University of Tübingen with a thesis on the Lanzelet of Ulrich von Zatzikhoven. From 1872 he worked as a schoolteacher in Solothurn and Zürich, and from 1879 to 1884 he headed the feuilleton of the Neue Zürcher Zeitung (NZZ).

In 1880 he obtained his habilitation at the University of Zürich, where in 1888 he was named a full professor of German literature. In Zürich, he also gave lectures at the Polytechnic School (from 1896).

Selected works 
 Lexicalisch-etymologische und grammatische Versuche älterer Zeit, 1876 – Lexicologic-etymological and grammatical essays from an earlier era.
 Bibliothek älterer Schriftwerke der deutschen Schweiz und ihres Grenzgebietes (edited with Ferdinand Vetter; 1877–92) – Library of older literary works of German-speaking Switzerland and its border areas.
 Gedichte (by Heinrich Leuthold; edited by Baechtold, 2nd edition 1880).
 Deutsches lesebuch für höhere Lehranstalten der Schweiz, 1880 – German reader for higher educational institutions in Switzerland.
 Geschichte der Deutschen Literatur in der Schweiz, 1892 – History of German literature in Switzerland.
 Gottfried Kellers Leben (3 volumes, 1894–97) – Biography of Gottfried Keller.
He was the author of numerous biographies in the Allgemeine Deutsche Biographie.

References

External links
 

1848 births
1897 deaths
People from the canton of Schaffhausen
Heidelberg University alumni
Ludwig Maximilian University of Munich alumni
University of Tübingen alumni
Academic staff of the University of Zurich
Literary historians
19th-century Swiss writers
Swiss expatriates in Germany